Klukom may refer to the following places in Choszczno County, West Pomeranian Voivodeship, Poland:

Nowy Klukom
Stary Klukom